"I" is the debut single by South Korean singer Kim Tae-yeon (better known by her mononym Taeyeon) featuring Verbal Jint, taken from Taeyeon's debut EP of the same name. The song lyrics was written by Taeyeon herself, Mafly, and Verbal Jint, while the music was composed and arranged by Myah Marie Langston, Bennett Armstrong, Justin T. Armstrong, Cosmopolitan Douglas, David Quinones, Jon Asher, and Ryan S. Jhun. It was released digitally on October 7, 2015, in conjunction with the release of the EP, and was released on Korean Broadcasting System's "K-Pop Connection" radio on October 9.

Upon its release, "I" received generally favorable reviews from music critics, who praised its musical styles and Taeyeon's vocals. The single peaked atop the South Korean Gaon Digital Chart and has since sold over 2.5 million digital copies as of October 2018. To promote the song and the EP, Taeyeon made several appearances on music programs including Inkigayo, Music Bank, and M Countdown.

Background and release 
South Korean singer Kim Tae-yeon (better known by her mononym Taeyeon) is a member and the leader of popular girl group Girls' Generation. She has been widely recognized as a talented vocalist, yet had never ventured to record her official solo album until 2015. Taeyeon's vocal abilities are showcased on tracks she recorded for Korean films and televisions, including "If" (Hong Gil Dong, 2008), "I Love You" (Athena: Goddess of War, 2010), and "Closer" (To the Beautiful You, 2012). In April 2015, Taeyeon is featured on labelmate Amber's song "Shake That Brass" for her debut extended play Beautiful, which generated much attention from the public.

On September 10, 2015, SM Entertainment revealed that Taeyeon was working on her then-upcoming debut solo album without ensuring the exact release date. On October 7, Taeyeon's debut extended play I was officially released by S.M. Entertainment. The EP received generally favorable reviews from music critics and was a commercial success in South Korea, peaking at number two on the Gaon Album Chart. The title track, "I", was released digitally in conjunction with the release of the EP as its lead single. The song was sent to Korean Broadcasting System's "K-Pop Connection" radio on October 9.

Composition 

"I" is a pop rock song that was compared to Taylor Swift's Red album opening track "State of Grace" by Jeff Benjamin from Billboard. The lyrics of the song were written from an autobiographical narrative perspective. The lyrics speak from Taeyeon's point of view on being a celebrity and, in the singer's own words, "about being yourself in a freer way, while moving on from hard and frustrating times". The singer has also said that she wanted the song to express a "Music is my life" feeling.

Music video
The music video was filmed in Auckland, New Zealand and employed nature scenery as the backdrop. It includes sweeping landscapes juxtaposed with city scenes and tells the story of a young woman "in search of her true identity". Taeyeon's older brother makes a cameo in the video as a patron of The Portland Public House bar in Kingsland suburb where she works.

Reception 
The song received positive reviews from music critics. It was named the 2nd and 15th best K-pop song of 2015 by US magazine Billboard and British magazine Dazed, respectively. It ranked #58 on Billboard's 100 Greatest K-Pop Songs of the 2010s. Commercially, the song is her best-selling single in the United States with digital sales totaling 15,000 units.

Accolades

Chart performance

Weekly charts

Monthly charts

Year-end charts

Sales

Release history

Credits 
Credits are adapted from the CD liner notes of I.

Studio 
 SM Blue Ocean Studio – recording, mixing, digital editing
 MonoTree Studio – recording, additional vocal editing
 Sterling Sound – mastering

Personnel 

 SM Entertainment – executive producer
 Lee Soo-man – producer
 Taeyeon – lyrics, vocals, background vocals
 Verbal Jint – featuring vocals, lyrics
 Mafly – lyrics
 Myah Marie Langston – composition, arrangement
 Bennett Armstrong – composition, arrangement
 Justin T. Armstrong – composition, arrangement
 Cosmopolitan Douglas – composition, arrangement
 David Quinones – composition, arrangement
 Jon Asher – composition, arrangement
 Ryan S. Jhun – composition, arrangement
 Lee Joo-myung – recording, background vocals
 G-high – vocal directing, Pro Tools operating, additional vocal editing
 Kim Cheol-sun – recording, mixing, digital editing
 Tom Coyne – mastering

See also
 List of Inkigayo Chart winners (2015)
 List of M Countdown Chart winners (2015)
 List of Music Bank Chart winners (2015)
 List of Show! Music Core Chart winners (2015)
 List of Show Champion Chart winners (2015)

References

External links 
 

2015 songs
2015 debut singles
Taeyeon songs
Korean-language songs
Songs written by David Quinones
Songs written by Jon Asher
Songs written by Ryan S. Jhun
SM Entertainment singles
Gaon Digital Chart number-one singles
Pop rock songs